The Petrified Forest 30 km south of Sarmiento, Argentina is a provincial natural monument. 

It a forest from the Cenozoic era, the petrified wood is of primitive conifers and palm trees.

References

External links

Petrified forests
Geology of Patagonia
Geology of Chubut Province
Cenozoic Argentina
Ecology of Patagonia
Paleontological sites of Argentina
Protected areas of Chubut Province
Tourist attractions in Chubut Province